Pine Grove Historic District may refer to:

Pine Grove Historic District (Avon, Connecticut), listed on the National Register of Historic Places in Hartford County, Connecticut
Pine Grove Historic District (Pine Grove, Pennsylvania), listed on the National Register of Historic Places in Schuylkill County, Pennsylvania